The Young Nun or La suora giovane is a 1965 Italian romantic drama film directed by Bruno Paolinelli. The film had cinematography by Erico Menczer and starred Laura Efrikian and Jonathan Elliot with music by Teo Usuelli.

Cast
 Laura Efrikian	... 	Serena
 Jonathan Elliot
 Cesarino Miceli Picardi	... 	Mo
 Carlo Alighiero	... 	Oste
 Maria Sardoch
 Adelaide Aste	... 	Iris
 Emilio Esposito	... 	Antonio Mathis
 Marcella Rovena

References

External links
 

1965 films
Italian drama films
1960s Italian-language films
1965 romantic drama films
Films directed by Bruno Paolinelli
1960s Italian films